Tomáš Kazár (born 8 October 1984) is a Czech footballer who plays as a midfielder. He previously played for Sigma Olomouc. He wears the number 9 shirt. He made his debut for Sigma Olomouc on 5 August 2007 in a 2–0 defeat to SK Ceske Budejovice.

References

External links

1984 births
Living people
Czech footballers
Association football midfielders
Czech First League players
SK Sigma Olomouc players